JT-60 (short for Japan Torus-60) is a large research tokamak, the flagship of Japan's magnetic fusion program, previously run by the Japan Atomic Energy Research Institute (JAERI) and currently run by the Japan Atomic Energy Agency's (JAEA) Naka Fusion Institute in Ibaraki Prefecture. It is properly an advanced tokamak, including a D-shaped plasma cross-section and active feedback control.

First designed in the 1970s as the "Breakeven Plasma Test Facility" (BPTF), the goal of the system was to reach breakeven fusion power, a goal set for the US's TFTR, the UK's JET and the Soviet T-15. JT-60 began operations in 1985, and like the TFTR and JET that began operations only shortly before it, JT-60 demonstrated performance far below predictions.

Over the next two decades, JET and JT-60 led the effort to regain the performance originally expected of these machines. JT-60 underwent two major modifications during this time, producing JT-60A, and then JT-60U (for "upgrade"). These changes resulted in significant improvements in plasma performance. , JT-60 currently holds the record for the highest value of the fusion triple product achieved:  = .  To date, JT-60 has the world record for the hottest ion temperature ever achieved (522 million °C); this record defeated the TFTR machine at Princeton in 1996. 

In 2020, JT60 was upgraded to JT-60SA. In 2021 and 2022, a poloidal field coil short circuit was investigated, and repairs were done.

JT-60U (Upgrade)

During deuterium (D–D fuel) plasma experiments in 1998, plasma conditions were achieved which would have achieved break-even—the point where the power produced by the fusion reactions equals the power supplied to operate the machine—if the D–D fuel were replaced with a 1:1 mix of deuterium and tritium (D–T fuel). 
JT-60 does not have the facilities to handle tritium; only the JET tokamak in the United Kingdom has such facilities as of 2018. 
In fusion terminology, JT-60 achieved conditions which in D–T would have provided a fusion energy gain factor (the ratio of fusion power to input power) Q = 1.25.
A self-sustaining nuclear fusion reaction would need a value of Q that is greater than 5.

In 2005, ferritic steel (ferromagnet) tiles were installed in the vacuum vessel to correct the magnetic field structure and hence reduce the loss of fast ions.
On May 9, 2006, the JAEA announced that the JT-60 had achieved a 28.6 second plasma duration time. 
The JAEA used new parts in the JT-60, having improved its capability to hold the plasma in its powerful toroidal magnetic field. 
The main future objective of JT-60 is to realize high-beta steady-state operation in the use of reduced radio-activation ferritic steel in a collision-less regime.

JT-60SA
It was planned for JT-60 to be disassembled and then upgraded to JT-60SA by adding niobium-titanium superconducting coils by 2010. 
It was intended for the JT60SA to be able to run with the same shape plasma as ITER. The central solenoid was designed to use niobium-tin (because of the higher (9 T) field).

Construction of the tokamak officially began in 2013, and it was to continue until 2020 with first plasma planned in September 2020. Assembly was completed in the spring of 2020, and in March 2021 it reached its full design toroidal field successfully, with a current of 25.7kA. A test of the poloidal field coils in March 2021 suffered a short circuit leading to a lengthy investigation and repair.

References

External links
 of the JT-60
  of the JT-60SA
 JT-60 diagram and parameters
 JAERI (English)
 JT-60's Newly Achieved Plasma Record (Japanese)  
 World Highest Fusion Triple Product Marked in High-βp H-mode Plasmas - Aug 1996 1.5*1021 m−3 s keV

Tokamaks
Nuclear technology in Japan